Admiral of the Fleet Terence Thornton Lewin, Baron Lewin,  (19 November 1920 – 23 January 1999) was a Royal Navy officer. He served in the Second World War and then commanded a destroyer, the Royal yacht, two frigates and an aircraft carrier before achieving higher command. He was First Sea Lord and Chief of the Naval Staff in the late 1970s and in that role he worked hard to secure a decent wage for servicemen and helped win them a 32% pay rise. He went on to be Chief of the Defence Staff during the Falklands War, serving as chief war planner and as Prime Minister Margaret Thatcher's chief advisor during the war. He was also the first Chief of Defence Staff to act as head of the Armed Forces rather than just Chairman of the Chiefs of Staff Committee.

Naval career
Born the son of Eric Lewin and Maggie Lewin (née Falconer) and educated at The Judd School in Tonbridge, where he was head prefect in 1938, Lewin joined the Royal Navy as a cadet in 1939. He was initially posted to the training ship HMS Vindictive but when the Second World War broke out in September 1939 he transferred to the cruiser  and then two months later to the battleship .

In the Valiant he took part in the Norwegian Campaign in April and May 1940 and then in the attack on the French Fleet at Mers-el-Kébir in July 1940. He transferred to the destroyer  in October 1941 and then to the destroyer  in January 1942. During a long period of service in the Ashanti he took part in the Arctic Convoys, and having been promoted to lieutenant on 1 July 1942, he took part in Operation Pedestal to relieve Malta in August 1942 and then the allied landings in North Africa in November 1942 before returning to the Arctic Convoys again and finally taking part in the allied landings in Normandy in June 1944. He served with distinction being mentioned in despatches three times and being awarded the Distinguished Service Cross in 1942 for saving the lives of many fellow servicemen when the destroyer  was hit by a torpedo.

He was posted to the cruiser  as gunnery officer in April 1946 and, after attending the advanced gunnery course at the Royal Naval College, Greenwich, in 1947, he returned to the staff at HMS Excellent in December. Promoted to lieutenant commander on 1 July 1949, he became gunnery officer of the First Destroyer Flotilla in the Mediterranean Fleet. He rejoined the staff of HMS Excellent in January 1952 and, having been promoted to commander on 31 December 1952, he joined the staff of the Second Sea Lord at the Admiralty in December 1953.

Lewin was given command of the destroyer  in October 1955 and then of HM Yacht Britannia in April 1957, before being promoted to captain on 30 June 1958. He went back to the Admiralty as Assistant Director of the Tactical Ship Requirements and Staff Duties Division in November 1958 and then, having been appointed a Lieutenant of the Royal Victorian Order in the 1959 New Year Honours, he became Assistant Director of the Tactical and Weapons Policy Division in 1960. After attending the Imperial Defence College in 1961, he was appointed Captain (F) of the 17th Frigate Squadron in December 1961 sailing successively in the frigates  and then . He went back to the Admiralty again as Director of Tactical and Weapons Policy in December 1963 and took command of the aircraft carrier  in May 1966. He was appointed Naval Aide-de-Camp to the Queen on 7 July 1967 and promoted to rear admiral on 7 January 1968, on appointment as Assistant Chief of the Naval Staff (Policy) before becoming Flag Officer Second in Command Far East Fleet in August 1969. Promoted to vice admiral on 7 October 1970, he became Vice Chief of the Naval Staff in January 1971. He was appointed Knight Commander of the Order of the Bath in the 1973 New Year Honours. As VCNS two of his most important projects were the approval of the Sea Harrier and the beginning of "group deployments," as the UK's far-flung naval forces had mostly disappeared. He was promoted to full admiral on 1 December 1973, on appointment as Commander-in-Chief Fleet and NATO Commander-in-Chief, Channel and Commander-in-Chief Eastern Atlantic and became Commander-in-Chief Naval Home Command in November 1975 before being advanced to Knight Grand Cross of the Order of the Bath in the 1976 Birthday Honours.

Lewin was appointed First Sea Lord and Chief of Naval Staff on 1 March 1977. In that role he worked hard to secure a decent wage for servicemen and helped win them a 32% pay rise. Promoted to Admiral of the Fleet on 6 July 1979, he went on to be Chief of the Defence Staff in September 1979 and served as a member of the War Cabinet during the Falklands War giving Prime Minister Margaret Thatcher his resolute support when losses began to be suffered.

Lewin was the first Chief of Defence Staff to act as Head of the Armed Forces rather than just Chairman of the Chiefs of Staff Committee. He was created a life peer, as Baron Lewin, of Greenwich in Greater London in October 1982 on his retirement.

Later life
In retirement, Lewin became Chairman of the Trustees of the National Maritime Museum, President of the Society for Nautical Research, a Liveryman of the Skinners' Company and of the Shipwrights' Company and an elder brother of Trinity House. His interests included military history: he was an expert on the life of Captain Cook. He was appointed a Knight of the Order of the Garter in April 1983. He died at his home at Ufford in Suffolk on 23 January 1999.

Family
In 1944, Lewin married Jane Branch-Evans; they had two sons and a daughter.

Arms

References

Sources
 
 
 Prince, Stephen. "British command and control in the Falklands Campaign." Defense & Security Analysis 18.4 (2002): 333–349.

Further reading
 Finlan, Alastair. The Royal Navy in the Falklands Conflict and the Gulf War: Culture and Strategy (Psychology Press, 2004).

|-

|-

First Sea Lords and Chiefs of the Naval Staff
Royal Navy admirals of the fleet
Royal Navy officers of World War II
Royal Navy personnel of the Falklands War
Crossbench life peers
Knights of the Garter
Knights Grand Cross of the Order of the Bath
Lieutenants of the Royal Victorian Order
Recipients of the Distinguished Service Cross (United Kingdom)
1920 births
1999 deaths
People educated at The Judd School
Chiefs of the Defence Staff (United Kingdom)
Graduates of the Royal Naval College, Greenwich
Graduates of the Royal College of Defence Studies
Military personnel from Kent
Members of Trinity House
Life peers created by Elizabeth II